Ravenstein is a 2020 British horror film directed by Eveshka Ghost and co-written with Thomas Walters. It is the third film produced by Rusalka Pictures.

Two friends find an abandoned worksite on their way home. Upon investigating the site they discover why it has been abandoned, for it is home to a terrifying monster known as the "Ravenstein". Their urban exploration instead becomes a fight for survival as they attempt to escape the creature's nest.

The film had a modest theatrical opening on October 24, 2020, amidst the COVID-19 pandemic and received mostly positive reviews, praising its commitment to the classic horror genre.

Plot 
Two friends, David (McClusky) and Marky (Kaneti-Dimmer), are riding their bikes home one evening when they stumble upon a gate opening to an abandoned worksite. Tempted by urban exploration, the pair enter the site and happen upon a homeless man, Jack (Wilson), who's been living at the factory. Jack tells the boys a dark tale about a school girl called Melissa, who was said to have made friends with an old gypsy woman. The girl's father didn't approve of their new friendship and interfered. The following day, Melissa received a blue crystal necklace from the gypsy which had a curse placed upon it. The curse was meant as punishment on the girl's father and would see him condemned to live out his remaining years as a hideous feathered creature. His transformation led him to abandon his family never to return, but one evening Melissa caught sight of her father and made several drawings. Her father suffered from separation anxiety and visited Melissa in the garden one night, where she gave him the drawings as a keepsake. Jack concludes the tale "...and he never came back".

Marky grows impatient and explores the worksite by himself, leaving David in the company of Jack. Marky enters a derelict barn house and in a broken mirror spots the reflection of a feathered monster stalking him. He panics and runs back to David to reveal what he's seen. David encourages Marky to show him and the pair return to the barn house before discovering the same monster stalking them both. They escape the creature before locking themselves inside a toilet facility, but the monster returns and tries to break in through the window. David fights it off and they decide to stay put. Meanwhile, two drunks, Charlie (Easterbrook) and Andy (Walters), are stumbling their way home, but their journey gets sidetracked when Andy enters the worksite. They both rest in the site for a while before Andy is attacked by the creature. Charlie tries to save his friend but realises it's too late so he hides to save himself. David and Marky cautiously leave the toilet facility in the barn house without encountering the monster. They begin exploring the site and find weapons. David decides to search an old dilapidated caravan and when the pair enter inside they find Charlie hiding there, he explains that his friend has been killed by a "Birdman". David and Marky offer to help Charlie but they agree that they first need to find Jack. As the group move across the site in search of Jack, they happen upon a unit building with a shrine set out on a table and drawings surrounded by candles. Jack appears from the shadows and confirms the group having witnessed "the Bird", and reveals that nobody can leave or "it'll get ya". Charlie loses his patience and runs to escape the site, but in his efforts he succumbs to the wrath of the feathered monster and gets killed. The creature then turns it's sights on David and Marky and begins chasing them, teleporting to capture its prey. David trips over and gets cornered by the monster but Marky creates a distraction for his friend, and with the creature following Marky, David runs to safety and hides separating the pair. The Ravenstein monster patrols its territory in the moonlight searching for its hidden prey before disappearing into the shadows. Marky rejoins David and they devise a plan to draw the creature away from the gate at the entrance to the site and go for help. David scouts the worksite unaware that the feathered creature remains hidden in the shadows watching him. Marky spots the monster and signals to David who encourages Marky to make a run for it. David lures the Ravenstein creature into Jack's hideout buying Marky time to escape. David's father, Ray (Eade), drives past the site in search of his son and notices David's bike laid on the ground covered in blood. Concerned, Ray investigates the site and soon discovers a unit building is being accommodated by a homeless person. On further investigation, Ray finds David hiding in terror and armed with a weapon. Ray queries David, but his son urgently exclaims that they have to leave because of the monster. Jack returns to his hideout and reunites with his previous employer, informing him that "You can't leave now, Ray". David learns that his dad knows Jack and that the worksite is his dad's old business premises, and the frustration and stress that's caused his dad to snap at him recently is a result of the tragic events that occurred and led to the conclusive end of his dad's business. David learns his dad and Jack were the only survivors of the murderous rampage by the feathered monster. Jack reminds David of the mysterious drawings in the shrine and asks if he's "figured it out yet?". David and Ray notice Jack's voice begin to change while he's speaking, and then his body movements and mannerisms twitch and contort uncontrollably. Jack moans in agony as the process of transformation begins and the Ravenstein Monster takes form. David and Ray are cornered in the hideout. They outsmart the creature and attempt to escape the site but the monster teleports blocking their way out. Ray apologises to his son believing this to be the end having lost hope and running out of ways to escape, but David has a moment of clarity and shows his dad the unit building with the shrine and the drawings. Ray confesses that he knew about Melissa's drawings but he could never figure out the meaning of her writing the phrase; "Home is where the heart is." Then after searching through Melissa's drawings it occurs to Ray that her drawing of an egg must suggest that the feathered monster has laid an egg somewhere in the site. David confirms his belief stating, "This whole place is it's nest!". They devise a plan to search for the egg and lead the Ravenstein monster out of its nesting ground. David takes his dad to an unexplored dilapidated barn and there they discover the creature watching over its nest. David creates a distraction enticing the feathered beast to search the area of disturbance. Meanwhile, Ray advances into the Bird's nest and takes the egg, but the monster attacks Ray who finds himself on the ground beneath the feathered creature helpless and moments from death. Marky suddenly appears and attacks the Birdman with a chair, saving Ray in the process. But not long after Marky saves Ray, then the foul feathered monster reappears and impales Marky in the spine with its claws, killing him instantly. David is horrified by Marky's death and cries out. Ray grabs the egg and quickly runs to David carrying it. Upon leaving the nesting ground, David takes possession of the egg, when Ray unexpectedly stumbles and falls over and injures himself. Ray insists he takes responsibility of the egg but David is reluctant to hand it over to him. He eventually gives in to his dad's request and the pair run towards Ray's car parked at the gate entrance. Ray notices David begins mounting his bike instead of getting in the car and queries him over it. David panics and insists they should leave the egg behind but his dad believes they have to take it to the police. An argument ensues between them opening old wounds in their relationship, when suddenly the monster teleports inside Ray's car and attacks him to regain possession of the egg. Ray throws the egg to David who cycles off with it, but the feathered creature follows David and teleports in front of him cutting his journey short. In the confusion, David loses the egg but can't find it. He turns around to see the monster lifting it from the ground and cradling it before approaching him with its claws drawn and raised. David lifts his arm in defence but then notices his dad speeding towards the Birdman and rolls out of the road before the car runs head on into the monster. Believing the creature to be dead, Ray examines the body first and then approaches the car, but the Ravenstein Monster was playing possum and makes a surprise attack on Ray, dragging him to the ground. Ray calls out to David to open the bonnet of the car. He struggles to reach a chainsaw from under the bonnet, so he kicks the monster across the road and picks himself up before turning around to face the feathered creature wielding the chainsaw. Ray approaches the Ravenstein Monster and saws the creatures head off. Ray picks up the decapitated head and throws it into the bushes. He approaches David and they both get seated inside the car and drive away. The lost egg is revealed in one piece and begins to hatch.

Production

Background 
Following a meeting during post-production on The Bastard Sword, Eveshka Ghost and Thomas Walters began searching for new locations and discussing story ideas that would be appropriate for each setting, one of which was an abandoned worksite. Soon after a script was written for the film they agreed the directorial duties would go to Ghost, and Walters would act as the film's producer.

Casting 
The cast for Ravenstein featured, James McClusky, who up to that time had been in every Rusalka picture and is considered to be a "good luck charm". The reason McClusky was considered was due to his loyalty on previous projects and on account of him "not having a chance to shine due to his supporting roles"; but Ghost also thought of actor, Nik Kaneti-Dimmer, who had previously appeared in The Granary, released in 2017. Kaneti-Dimmer and McClusky it happens were close friends and have good performing chemistry together.

Martyn Eade played Ray, David's father. A change from his previously more villainous role of "Mars" in The Bastard Sword.  However Chris Wilson, who also featured in The Bastard Sword, played the character, Jack, as well as doubling as "The Bird". During an interview, Thomas Walters commented that his favourite part of filming was helping Chris dress into the suit, or "Bird up" as he put it. Executive producer Xander Phillips described in a video recorded on-set that Chris Wilson is "Our resident Boris Karloff". due to his transformation into a monster.

The film featured the supporting characters "Charlie" and "Andy", played by ex-Bastard Sword actor Seth Easterbrook and producer Thomas Walters. The two of which portrayed drunk characters who got sidetracked on their journey home.

Filming and Release 
Ravenstein was filmed entirely in privately owned locations in West Sussex with a skeleton crew and was filmed over a total of 12 sessions, however due to time constraints the audio was completely dubbed and the film was in post-production for a total of two years.

The final shot of the film, which required no actors, was left for a year until the leaves would bear a similar colour to the rest of the film.

Due to the small number of crew, it was not uncommon for crew members to perform multiple tasks or fill multiple roles in production, and Chris Wilson also composed the score for the film with an original Djent Metal soundtrack, opposed to the more traditional approach of a Classical score composed by Ghost, as is often heard in previous Rusalka pictures.

When asked about the Ravenstein costume, Chris Wilson stated that "the feathers were painstakingly stitched in by hand" to create a truly custom and original costume. The rest of the props were cheap to match the nature of the B-Movie aesthetic and to reflect a film of that era.

Ravenstein was released on October 24, 2020, but did not have a theatrical run due to the COVID-19 Pandemic. It went straight to DVD, Blu-ray and Digital and even featured a collectible limited run on VHS tape.

Sequel 
During a Q&A session at the premiere on October 24, 2020, a question was raised about a potential follow up to Ravenstein and the filmmakers expressed some interest, however no official statement has yet been given.

Cast 

 James McClusky as David, an apathetic urban explorer. 
 Nik Kaneti-Dimmer as Marky, an eager urban explorer. 
 Chris Wilson as Jack, a homeless man who's found his home amongst the rubble of the factory.
 Martyn Eade as Ray, David's father, who previously owned the factory.
 Seth Easterbrook as Charlie, a drunk mentor.
 Thomas Walters as Andy, a drunk liability.

Awards

External links 

 Ravenstein  at IMDb
 Ravenstein at Rotten Tomatoes

2020 horror films